Culver Union Hospital is a historic hospital building located at Crawfordsville, Montgomery County, Indiana. It was built in 1902 and was named after L.L. Culver who donated $10,000 towards the construction.  The building is a four-story, rectangular, Colonial Revival style brick structure.  It is 13 bays wide and has a central projecting entry bay and gable roof.  It features a two-story, open and circular entry porch supported by Ionic order columns.  Additions were made to the original building in 1940–1942, 1966, 1971, and 1977. The building was closed in 1984 due to being unsafe inside the building. In 2016 the building was converted to an apartment complex by Flaherty and Collins Properties. The property is now known as Historic Whitlock Place.

It was listed on the National Register of Historic Places in 2001.

References

Hospital buildings on the National Register of Historic Places in Indiana
Colonial Revival architecture in Indiana
International style architecture in Indiana
Hospital buildings completed in 1929
Buildings and structures in Montgomery County, Indiana
National Register of Historic Places in Montgomery County, Indiana
Crawfordsville, Indiana